Richard Arkwright  (30 September 1781 – 28 March 1832) was an English politician.

He was the oldest son of Richard Arkwright (died 1843) of Willersley Castle, Derbyshire, and grandson of the entrepreneur Sir Richard Arkwright (1732–1792), whose invention of the spinning frame and other industrial innovations made him very wealthy.

Young Richard was educated at Eton and at Trinity College, Cambridge.
He and his five brothers were endowed as landed gentry by their father, who gave Richard £30,000 on his marriage in 1803 (equivalent to £ in ).
He managed his father's estates at Normanton Turville (near Thurlaston, Leicestershire) and Sutton Scarsdale in  Derbyshire.

Living at Normanton Turville, he served as an officer in the yeomanry, and as Member of Parliament for Rye from 1813 to 1818, and from 1826 to 1830.

References

External links 
 

1781 births
1832 deaths
Members of the Parliament of the United Kingdom for English constituencies
UK MPs 1812–1818
UK MPs 1826–1830
People educated at Eton College
Alumni of Trinity College, Cambridge
People from Blaby District
British Yeomanry officers